Beckianum beckianum is a species of air-breathing land snail, a terrestrial pulmonate gastropod mollusc in the family Achatinidae.

Subspecies 
Subspecies of Beckianum beckianum include:
 Beckianum beckianum beckianum (L. Pfeiffer, 1846)
 Beckianum beckianum gabbianum (Angas, 1879)

Description 
Beckianum beckianum is a small snail.

Distribution 
Beckianum beckianum is believed to be native to the Caribbean Basin.

The distribution of Beckianum beckianum includes the Venezuela, West Indies, and Central America.

 Nicaragua
 Honduras
 Costa Rica
 USA - introduced:
 Miami-Dade County, Florida – it has been reported since 2003
 Broward County, Florida – it has been reported since 2003
 Cuba - probably introduced

Lesser Antilles
 Saint Martin – first reported in 2001
 Saint Barthélemy
 Saba – first collected in 1949
 Saint Kitts and Nevis – first collected in 1949
 Antigua – first collected in 1955
 Guadeloupe – possibly introduced. First reported in 1867
 Dominica – introduced. First reported in 2009
 Martinique – introduced. First reported in 1874
 Trinidad – first collected in 1948
 Margarita – first collected in 1936

This species was introduced with horticultural shipments to the Hawaiian Islands in the early 1900s.

This snail can occasionally be spread via trade of cut flowers and beans (Phaseolus sp.).

Ecology 
Beckianum beckianum is considered to be a detritivore (eats detritus) and/or phytophagous (eats plants).

References
This article incorporates public domain text, a public domain work of the United States Government from the reference.

Subulininae
Gastropods described in 1846